Volodymyr Dobrianskyi (born December 12, 1966, in Horodok) is a Ukrainian scientist, archaeologist, historian, speleologist, and researcher of antiquities, fortifications and toponymy. He became a member of the Ukrainian Society for the Protection of Historical and Cultural Monuments in 1981, the Shevchenko Scientific Society in 2000, and the National Union of Journalists of Ukraine from 2016 to 2020. He also co-founded the NGO "Alternative-Chortkiv". He also participated in liquidating the Chernobyl accident of the second category.

Dobrianskyi comes from an ancient family of the Polish nobility with the coat of arms of Sas.

Biography 
Dobrianskyi graduated from the Faculty of History of Yuri Fedkovych Chernivtsi State University in (1994), then worked as a history teacher in the Chortkiv region, and was secretary of the Historical and Educational Society "Memorial", a researcher at the Ternopil Regional Museum of Local Lore, the Chortkiv centralized library system, and a senior researcher at the Chortkiv Municipal Museum of Local Lore.

From 1985 to 1987, Dobrianskyi served in the Ukrainian army. During his military service in the 3,238th military unit, he took part in the liquidation of the Chernobyl accident (from April–May 1986, and again from November 1986-January 1987).

Research activities 

Dobrianskyi has written over 100 scientific publications in professional journals, as well as many local lore and journalistic articles in the press.

Research and Discoveries:

Dobrianskyi has discovered over 100 archeological monuments in the territory of Zalishchyk, Borshchiv, Buchach, Chortkiv, Husiatyn and Terebovlya districts;

He located about 30 objects from defensive fortifications (settlements, castles, redoubts, lunettes) in Dobrovlyany, Lysychnyky, Bedrykivtsi, Shmankivtsi, Shershenivka, Zvenigorod, Yablunov, Kotsyubyntsi;

He has investigated about 50 previously unknown caves in Gorodok, Zozulyntsi, Kasperivtsi, Chortkiv, Uhryn, Shmankivtsi and other settlements of the Ternopil region.

Another area of activity is Dobrianskyi's study of ancient relics of ancient Slavic vocabulary, which are reflected in the toponymy of the region; on the basis of archaeological surveys of localities these can be used to reconstruct ancient oikonyms (settlements).

In 2019, at the 40-meter height of the tower of the Saint Stanislaus church in Chortkiv, archaeologist, researcher of fortifications and antiquities Volodymyr Dobrianskyi discovered a detonator of a shrapnel projectile, according to its flight trajectory determined that the 1st, 3rd, 4th and 7th cannon regiments (64 guns) under the command of Ataman Kirill Karas during the Chortkiv offensive (June 7–28, 1919) were stationed in the woods west of the village of Shmankivtsi in the Chortkiv district.

References

Sources 
 Pogoretsky, V. Unemployed archaeologist // Free life plus. - 2012. - No. 67 (August 31). - P. 5. - (Rogue in the native land?).
 Unemployed Chortkiv archaeologist // Golden Pectoral. - 2013. - April 10.
 Both in word and in the experience of a historian and archaeologist // Voice of the People. - 2014. - No. 52 (December 12). - P. 12. - (Currently out of print).
 Dobryansky Volodymyr Kazymyrovych // Geologists and geographers of Ternopil region. - Ternopil: Osadtsa Yu.V., 2021. - 108—110 p.
 Gugushvili, T. Volodymyr Dobryansky: "Love for archeology and history is the meaning of my life" // Free life plus. - 2021. - No. 104 (December 29). - P. 4. - (Defender of Antiquities).
 Gugushvili, T. Volodymyr Dobryansky: "Love for archeology and history is the meaning of my life" // Free Life. - 2022. - January 5.
 Goshiy, I. Volodymyr Dobryansky: "Black diggers destroy the history of our region for their own enrichment" // Nova Ternopilska Gazeta. - 2022. - January 19.

1966 births
Living people
Ukrainian archaeologists
People from Ternopil Oblast